Zhang Yuting (born 4 August 1999) is a Chinese short track speed skater. She won a gold medal at the 2022 Winter Olympics in the mixed team relay.

References

Living people
1999 births
Short track speed skaters at the 2022 Winter Olympics
Olympic short track speed skaters of China
Chinese female short track speed skaters
Olympic gold medalists for China
Olympic bronze medalists for China
Medalists at the 2022 Winter Olympics
Olympic medalists in short track speed skating
21st-century Chinese women